Bala Velayat may refer to:
 Bala Velayat District
 Bala Velayat Rural District (disambiguation)